The Women's solo event during the synchronised swimming competition at the 1994 Commonwealth Games in Victoria, British Columbia was held from 19 to 22 August at Saanich Commonwealth Place.

Results
Six athletes competed.

Final

References

Solo